Newton–Wigner localization (named after Theodore Duddell Newton and Eugene Wigner) is a scheme for obtaining a position operator for massive relativistic quantum particles. It is known to largely conflict with the Reeh–Schlieder theorem outside of a very limited scope.

The Newton–Wigner position operators 1, 2, 3,  are the premier notion of position
in relativistic quantum mechanics of a single particle. They enjoy the same 
commutation relations with the 3 space momentum operators and transform under
Though formally they have the same properties with respect to 1, 
2,  3, as
the position in ordinary QM, they have additional properties: One of these is that

This ensures that the free particle moves at the expected velocity with the given momentum/energy.

Apparently these notions were discovered when attempting to define a self adjoint operator in the relativistic setting that resembled the 
position operator in basic quantum mechanics in the sense that at low momenta it 
approximately agreed with that operator. It also has several famous strange behaviors, one of
which is seen as the motivation for having to introduce quantum field theory.

References

M.H.L. Pryce, Proc. Roy. Soc. 195A, 62 (1948)
V. Bargmann and E. P. Wigner, Proc Natl Acad Sci USA 34, 211-223  (1948). pdf

Quantum field theory
Axiomatic quantum field theory